The 2017–18 Puebla F.C. season was the club's 71st professional season in Mexico's top-flight football league. The season is split into two tournaments—the Torneo Apertura and the Torneo Clausura—each with identical formats and each contested by the same eighteen teams. The club also played Copa MX. Rafael García Torres was named the club head coach on June 5, 2017, taking over for sacked coach José Cardozo.

Players

First-team squad
As of 7 January 2017

For recent transfers, see List of Mexican football transfers summer 2017

Statistics

Goalscorers

Attendance
Puebla's Home Attendance by round, Estadio Cuahutemoc has a capacity of 51,726.

Competitions

Overview

Liga MX

Apertura 2017

Results summary

Results by round

Matchday

Copa MX

Apertura 2017

Matches

Group 4

Clausura 2018

Results summary

Matchday

Copa MX

Clausura 2018

Matches

Group 2

References

External links

Puebla F.C. seasons
2017–18 Liga MX season